Luan Jin (born 1958) is a retired male badminton player from China who rated among the world's best singles players in the early to mid-1980s after China gained entry into the International Badminton Federation (now Badminton World Federation).

Career
Luan won the All England Open Badminton Championships in men's singles in 1983, reversing a loss to Morten Frost in the 1982 final.  He was a key member of China's Thomas Cup (men's international) teams of 1982 and 1984, the first of which narrowly won and the second of which narrowly lost the World Team title to arch-rival Indonesia. In these final round Thomas Cup show-downs Luan defeated Rudy Hartono and Liem Swie King.

Achievements

Asian Games 
Men's singles

Asian Championships 
Men's singles

IBF World Grand Prix
The World Badminton Grand Prix sanctioned by International Badminton Federation (IBF) from 1983 to 2006.

Men's singles

External links
European results
Profile

Badminton players from Fujian
Living people
Asian Games medalists in badminton
1958 births
Chinese male badminton players
Badminton players at the 1978 Asian Games
Badminton players at the 1982 Asian Games
People from Xiamen
Asian Games gold medalists for China
Asian Games silver medalists for China
Asian Games bronze medalists for China
Medalists at the 1978 Asian Games
Medalists at the 1982 Asian Games
20th-century Chinese people